Juvenal Ubaldo Ordoñez Salazar (16 May 1948 – 7 December 2009) was a Peruvian politician and a Congressman representing Tacna for the 2006–2011 term. Ordoñez belonged to the Union for Peru party. He died in office on 7 December 2009.

Biography 
Juvenal Ordóñez was born in the city of Tacna, on May 16, 1948. He studied at the Coronel Bolognesi Great Boys' School Unit in his hometown. Later, he obtained the title of secondary teacher in the specialty of Physics-Mathematics at the Champagnat Superior Normal School in Tacna. He studied Social Communication. He served as a secondary education teacher. He was district mayor of Ilabaya, alderman of the Provincial Municipality of Tacna, but above all he was a great social fighter.

He participated in the 2006 elections, running for the parliamentary representation of the Tacna Region for the electoral alliance Unión por el Perú-Partido Nacionalista Peruano, being elected with 14,876 preferential votes.

External links
Official Congressional Site

Union for Peru politicians
Members of the Congress of the Republic of Peru
1948 births
2009 deaths
Peruvian Nationalist Party politicians
People from Tacna